The North Arlington School District is a comprehensive community public school district that serves students in pre-kindergarten through twelfth grade from North Arlington in Bergen County, New Jersey, United States.

As of the 2021–22 school year, the district, comprising six schools, had an enrollment of 1,915 students and 144.2 classroom teachers (on an FTE basis), for a student–teacher ratio of 13.2:1.

The district is classified by the New Jersey Department of Education as being in District Factor Group "DE", the fifth-highest of eight groupings. District Factor Groups organize districts statewide to allow comparison by common socioeconomic characteristics of the local districts. From lowest socioeconomic status to highest, the categories are A, B, CD, DE, FG, GH, I and J.

In the 1970s and 1980s, declining enrollment led North Arlington to be one of the few school districts in the state that featured involuntary "combined classes" whereby classes at their Roosevelt School for grades 4 and 5 and for grades 6 and 7 were combined into a single classroom with a single teacher for each pair of grades.

Awards and recognition
In 2010, Roosevelt Elementary School was recognized with the National Blue Ribbon Schools Award of Excellence by the United States Department of Education.

Schools 
Schools in the district (with 2020–21 school enrollment data from the National Center for Education Statistics) are:
Elementary schools
Franklin D Roosevelt Elementary School with 123 students in grades PreK-5
Alicia Giammanco, Principal
George Washington Elementary School with 325 students in grades PreK-5
Elaine Jaume, Principal
Thomas Jefferson Elementary School with 172 students in grades K-5
Marie Griggs, Principa
Susan B Anthony Elementary School with 248 students in grades PreK-5
Jennifer Rodriguez, Principal
Middle school
Veterans Middle School with 464 students in grades 6-8
Nicole Campbell Russo, Principal
High school
North Arlington High School with 548 students in grades 9-12
Patrick D. Bott, Principal

Administration 
Core members of the district's administration are:
Dr. Stephen M. Yurchak, Superintendent
Samantha Dembowski

Board of education
The district's board of education, with five members, sets policy and oversees the fiscal and educational operation of the district through its administration. As a Type II school district, the board's trustees are elected directly by voters to serve three-year terms of office on a staggered basis, with either one or two seats up for election each year held (since 2012) as part of the November general election. The board appoints a superintendent to oversee the day-to-day operation of the district.

References

External links
North Arlington School District

School Data for the North Arlington School District, National Center for Education Statistics

New Jersey District Factor Group DE
North Arlington, New Jersey
School districts in Bergen County, New Jersey